RK Čelik is a Bosnian rugby club based in Zenica. They are the most successful team in the country, having won all Bosnian cup and championship titles since Rugby Federation of Bosnia and Herzegovina was formed in 1992, as well as the Rugby Championship of Yugoslavia 7 times, which made them second most successful club in the former country.

History
The club was founded on 5 March 1972 as RK Zenica before changing their name to RK Čelik in 1978.

External links
RK Čelik at blogspot

Bosnia and Herzegovina rugby union teams
Rugby clubs established in 1972
Sport in Zenica